The characters of The Confidant, a 2012 Hong Kong television drama produced by TVB, are both fictional and real-life characters living during the reign of the Tongzhi Emperor, the tenth emperor of the Qing Dynasty. The drama is a dramatisation on the life of imperial eunuch Li Lianying, one of the most powerful figures of the latter years of the Qing Dynasty.

Main characters

Imperial eunuchs
Character names are in Cantonese romanisation.

Palace maids
Character names are in Cantonese romanisation.

Royal Aisin-Gioro clan
Character names are in Cantonese romanisation.

Secondary characters
Cilla Kung as Consort Wai (慧妃), a concubine of the Tung-chi Emperor. Empress Dowager Chee-hei wants Consort Wai to be empress, but Tung-chi ultimately chooses Empress Dowager Chee-on's niece, who becomes Empress Ka-shun.
Tsui Wing as Guwalgiya Sing-po (蘇完瓜爾佳·勝保), a general and Prince Kung's assistant.
Lo Chun-shun as Law On-tai (羅安康), a eunuch serving in King-yan Palace.
Fred Cheng as Lei Wing-ning (利永寧), a eunuch serving in King-yan Palace.
Au Sui-wai as Prince Shun (醇親王), also known as the Seventh Imperial Prince, Prince Kung's younger brother.
Eric Li as Pak-lun (伯倫), a palace guard and Sin-yung's lover.
Peter Pang as Kwai-cheung (葉赫那拉·桂祥), Empress Dowager Chee-hei's younger brother.
Leo Tsang as Woyan (烏齊格里·倭仁), a court official.
Steve Lee as Powan (索綽絡·寶鋆), a court official.
Meini Cheung as Sixth Princess Consort (六福晉), the wife of Prince Kung.
Angel Chiang as Siu Chai (小釵), a prostitute who becomes On Tak-hoi's wife.
Lau Kong as Lei Yuk (李玉), Lei Lin-ying's father.
Fung So-bor as Cho Kuk (曹菊), Lei Lin-ying's mother.
Vin Choi as Yuk-jun (玉俊), a Peking Opera singer, and Consort Yuen's lover.
Giovanni Mok as Lei On-tai (李安泰), Lei Lin-ying's younger teenage brother.

See also
The Confidant

References
The Confidant Cast at TVB.com

Lists of drama television characters
Lists of Hong Kong television series characters